Piz digl Gurschus is a mountain of the Oberhalbstein Alps, overlooking Ausserferrera in the Swiss canton of Graubünden. It lies on the range separating the valleys of Ferrera (west) and Sursés (east), west of the watershed.

References

External links
 Piz digl Gurschus on Hikr

Mountains of the Alps
Mountains of Switzerland
Mountains of Graubünden
Ferrera